What's My Favorite Word? is the fourteenth studio album by American rapper Too Short. It was released on October 29, 2002, through Jive Records, making it his eleventh album on the label.

The answer to the question posed in the album's title is "bitch."

Track listing

Charts

References

Too Short albums
2002 albums
Albums produced by Ant Banks
Albums produced by Lil Jon
Jive Records albums